During the Gallipoli campaign in 1915, several battles were fought near the village of Krithia, today Alçıtepe. The village was an objective of the first day of the landing, 25 April 1915. Over the following months, invading British Empire and French troops, who had landed near Cape Helles at the end of the peninsula, made several attempts to capture the village. It was never reached; the Turkish defenders successfully repulsed every assault.

The attacks came to be known as:
 The First Battle of Krithia - 28 April
 The Second Battle of Krithia - 6 May - 8 May
 The Third Battle of Krithia - 4 June
 The Battle of Krithia Vineyard - 6 August – 13 August

References

External links 

 

Battles of the Gallipoli campaign
Adrianople vilayet
1915 in the Ottoman Empire